Mansudae Overseas Projects is a construction company based in Jongphyong-dong, Phyongchon District, Pyongyang, North Korea. It is the international commercial division of the Mansudae Art Studio. As of August 2011, it had earned an estimated US$160 million overseas building monuments and memorials. As of 2015, Mansudae projects have been built in 17 countries: Angola, Algeria, Benin, Botswana, Cambodia, Chad, Democratic Republic of Congo, Egypt, Equatorial Guinea, Ethiopia, Germany, Malaysia, Mali, Mozambique, Namibia, Senegal, Togo and Zimbabwe. The company uses North Korean artists, engineers, and construction workers rather than those of the local artists and workers. Sculptures, monuments, and buildings are in the style of North Korean socialist realism.

Angola

Mansudae Overseas Projects constructed the President Agostinho Neto Cultural Centre in Luanda, Angola.

Benin

In Benin, the company has built a statue of Béhanzin.

Botswana

In Botswana, it constructed the Three Dikgosi Monument, also called the Three Chiefs monument.

Cambodia
Angkor Panorama museum was built next to the Angkor temples. The museum is operated jointly by APSARA and Mansudae. About half of 40 staff members are from North Korea. Unlike the earlier Mansudae's projects abroad, this time North Korea is attempting to make money by complementary sales of tickets and art.  the museum is projected to be completely handed over to Cambodians in twenty years, unless North Korean profits stay low, and the time needs to be extended. The number of visitors to the museum have been meager so far. However, Cambodian deputy director of the museum stated in an interview that in the present day it is very hard to make money with museums, and he remarked that marketing of the museum has not yet started. As of January 2020, the museum has been shuttered indefinitely due to international sanctions compliance.

Democratic Republic of the Congo
In the Democratic Republic of the Congo, it has built a statue of Laurent-Désiré Kabila.

Ethiopia
The Tiglachin Monument, also known as the Derg Monument, is a  pillar erected in Addis Ababa, Ethiopia was donated by North Korea in 1984. The monument has fallen into neglect.

Germany 
Germany is the only western democracy to have a North Korean-built structure.

Mozambique

In Mozambique, Mansudae Overseas Projects constructed the Samora Machel Statue in Independence Square, Maputo in 2011.

Namibia

Namibia is the only country to have commissioned four public works by Mansudae Overseas Projects.

Heroes' Acre (inaugurated August 2002) with a statue of the unknown soldier near Windhoek, Namibia.
The New State House of Namibia (inaugurated 2008) on a 40.4 ha site in Windhoek.
Independence Memorial Museum (inaugurated 2014), central Windhoek.

Senegal
In Senegal, the company built the African Renaissance Monument.

Togo 
In the north of Togo, close to the village of Sara-Kawa, the late president Gnassingbé Eyadéma and some of his closest aides were in a plane crash on 24 January 1974. Eyadéma survived. A monument was erected with a huge statue of Eyadéma.

Zimbabwe

National Heroes Acre is a  burial ground and national monument in Harare, Zimbabwe. Work began on the site in 1981 and used by Zimbabwean and North Korean workers. It closely mirrors the design of the Revolutionary Martyrs' Cemetery in Taesong-guyŏk, just outside Pyongyang, North Korea.

The Joshua Nkomo Statue was constructed in 2010 in Bulawayo, Zimbabwe.

References

Further reading

External links

 Mansudae Art Studio, North Korea's Colossal Monument Factory
 Tycho van der Hoog: Monuments of power: the North Korean origin of nationalist heritage in Namibia and Zimbabwe. - Leiden : African Studies Centre, 2019
 Tycho van der Hoog: North Korean monuments in southern Africa: Legitimizing party rule through the National Heroes’ Acres in Zimbabwe and Namibia. Leiden, 2017

 
History of Namibia